The Roman Catholic Apostolic Prefecture of the Marshall Islands is a Latin rite apostolic prefecture (pre-diocesan missionary ecclesiastical jurisdiction of the Catholic Church, below apostolic vicariate, lacking the rank of diocese and the right to a titular bishop), in the South Sea Republic of the Marshall Islands.

The apostolic prefecture is (atypically) a suffragan in the ecclesiastical province of the Metropolitan Province of Agaña (on Guam, US), yet still depends (like an exempt mission) on the Congregation for the Evangelization of Peoples.

Although the see of the prefecture, the Cathedral of the Assumption, in Majuro, on Majuro Atoll, is not in the United States, the prelature includes Wake Island, which is an unorganized, unincorporated territory of the United States.

Statistics 
As per 2014, it has 4,975 Catholics (9.5% of 52,500 total population) on 181 km² of islands in a marine area nearly the size of the United States, pastorally served in nine churches in 11 parishes, by 6 priests (1 diocesan, 5 religious), 1 deacon, 15 lay religious (5 brothers, 10 sisters) and a seminarian.

History 
Missionaries from the Order of Missionaries of the Sacred Heart (M.S.C.) arrived in 1898.
In 1905, a pre-diocesan jurisdiction was established as Mission sui juris of Marshall Islands, on territory split off from the then Apostolic Vicariate of New Pomerania (mainly New Britain, in the Bismarck Archipelago of Papua New Guinea).

On April 5, 1923, the independent mission was suppressed, its territory being merged into the then Apostolic Vicariate of Mariana, Caroline and Marshall Islands.

On April 23, 1993, Pope John Paul II split the former Diocese of Carolines-Marshalls into the Apostolic Prefecture of the Marshall Islands and the Diocese of Caroline Islands. In 2007, Father James Gould, apostolic prefect, resigned. Father Raymundo Sabio, a Filipino missionary, was chosen to succeed him.

Ordinaries 
(all Latin Rite) 

 Ecclesiastical Superior of the mission sui iuris Marshall Islands 
 Father Bruno Schinxe, Missionaries of the Sacred Heart of Jesus (M.S.C.), (1905 - death 1915)

 Apostolic Prefects of Marshall Islands''
 James Charles Gould, Jesuits (S.J.) (born USA) (23 April 1993 – resigned 21 December 2007), no other prelature
 Raymundo Taco Sabio, Missionaries of the Sacred Heart of Jesus (M.S.C.) (born Philippines) (22 December 2007 – retired 28 June 2017), no previous prelature
 Ariel Galido, M.S.C. (born Philippines) (28 June 2017 – ...), no previous prelature

See also 

 Catholic Church by country
 Global organisation of the Catholic Church
 List of Catholic dioceses (alphabetical) (including archdioceses)
 List of Catholic dioceses (structured view) (including archdioceses)
 List of Catholic dioceses in South Pacific Islands

References

Sources and external links 
 GCatholic, with Google map and - satellite photo - data for all sections
 Catholic Hierarchy Profile of the Apostolic Prefecture of the Marshall Islands

Apostolic prefectures
Roman Catholic Ecclesiastical Province of Agaña
Roman Catholic dioceses and prelatures established in the 20th century
Religious organizations established in 1993